Sten Rudberg (13 September 1917 – 22 October 1996) was a Swedish geologist and geomorphologist. He was the son of Gunnar Rudberg. Sten Rudberg was appointed chair professor of the Göteborg University in 1958 after incumbent professor Karl-Erik Bergsten moved to Lund University. In 1959 Rudberg was elected into the Royal Society of Sciences and Letters in Gothenburg. Subsequently, in 1961 Rudberg's professorship was transformed into a professorship in Physical geography. In 1964 Rudberg went to head the department of Physical geography after the Geography department of the Göteborg University was dissolved and Human geography formed its own department. Rudberg remained professor in Gothenburg until 1984.

Rudbergs Ph.D. thesis dealt with the large-scale geomorphology and denudation chronology of Västerbotten in northern Sweden, he subsequently continued to work on large scale geomorphology of Scandinavia while also making scientific contributions dealing with wind erosion, cliff retreat, and periglacial mass movements. While working with large-scale geomorphology Rudberg was not concerned  with tectonics.

References

1917 births
1996 deaths
Swedish geographers
20th-century Swedish geologists
Swedish geomorphologists
Uppsala University alumni
Academic staff of the University of Gothenburg
Academic staff of Uppsala University
Members of the Royal Society of Sciences and Letters in Gothenburg
20th-century geographers